Events in the year 1929 in Portugal.

Incumbents
President: Óscar Carmona
Prime Minister: José Vicente de Freitas (until 8 July); Artur Ivens Ferraz

Events
8 July – Artur Ivens Ferraz takes over as Prime Minister, succeeding José Vicente de Freitas

Arts and entertainment

Sports
Atlético S.C. founded
Eléctrico F.C. founded
Pedrouços A.C. founded

Births
23 December – Alberto da Costa Pereira, footballer (d. 1990).

Deaths

4 April – João Franco, politician (born 1855)
31 July – José de Castro, lawyer, journalist and politician (born 1868)
31 October – António José de Almeida, politician (born 1866)
31 October – José Relvas, land owner and politician (born 1858)
17 December – Manuel de Oliveira Gomes da Costa, military officer and politician (born 1863)

References

 
1920s in Portugal
Portugal
Years of the 20th century in Portugal
Portugal